Frank Fools Crow (circa 1890 – 1989) was an Oglala Lakota civic and religious leader.  'Grandfather', or 'Grandpa Frank' as he was often called, was a nephew of Black Elk who worked to preserve Lakota traditions, including the Sun Dance and yuwipi ceremonies.  He supported Lakota sovereignty and treaty rights, and was a leader of the traditional faction during the armed standoff at Wounded Knee in 1973.  With writer Thomas E. Mails, he produced two books about his life and work, Fools Crow in 1979, and Fools Crow: Wisdom and Power in 1990.

Early life
Fools Crow was born near Porcupine Creek on Pine Ridge Indian Reservation in South Dakota on either June 24 or 27 between 1890 and 1892. His father, Fools Crow, who was  also called Eagle Bear, was the Porcupine District leader.  His mother was Spoon Hunter, who died four days after giving birth to him.  She was the daughter of Porcupine Tail, for whom the community was named. His paternal grandfather, Knife Chief, fought with warriors who defeated Custer at the Battle of Little Big Horn, and his great–grandfather, Holds the Eagle, was a medicine man and holy man, or Wičháša Wakȟáŋ. Raised in the traditional way by his father, aunt, and stepmother Emily Big Road, he did not attend "the white man's school" as his father did not approve. This is why he did not speak fluent English. As a young man he traveled around the United States with the Buffalo Bill Cody's Buffalo Bill's Wild West show.  He spent much of his life serving his people as a medicine man, healer, and teacher.

"Go to Wounded Knee ... "
On February 28, 1973, members of the American Indian Movement, with their allies and supporters, including Fools Crow, seized and occupied the village of Wounded Knee.  It was here, in 1890, that the followers of Spotted Elk, another, earlier traditional leader, had been massacred by the United States Army's 7th Cavalry Regiment.  Two weeks before that, Sitting Bull himself had been killed, by police acting at the behest of these new rulers.  Thus had begun the relentless suppression of the Lakota nation:  their institutions, the religion, and even the language.  Each decade since that "time of great melancholy", when hopes for sovereignty had "died in bloody snow", brought renewed demands for more Lakota land, always in violation of treaty agreements.

Dick Wilson had become chairman of the Pine Ridge Reservation in 1972.  A heavy–drinking bootlegger known for corruption, he favored giving up more Lakota land, even the Pahá Sápa itself.  He soon used federal government funds to create his own private vigilante "goon squad", with which to terrorize his adversaries.  Those who opposed Wilson and his regime formed the "Oglala Sioux Civil Rights Organization", led by Pedro Bissonette, and worked to impeach him.  One petition to impeach Wilson contained more signatures than the number of people who had originally voted for him.  Wilson postponed impeachment hearings which were scheduled for February 14.  Immediately thereafter, federal forces moved into the area, including a counter–insurgency "Special Operations Group", which set up and manned sand–bagged machine gun positions at the BIA building.  On February 23, thus reinforced and without a proper tribal council quorum, Wilson was "exonerated" and quickly banned "all  public meetings and demonstrations" on the reservation.

The night that the occupation took place, the leaders of AIM met with the traditional Oglala elders and leaders.

As senior elder, Fools Crow spoke to the young leaders in his native Lakota language (he never spoke English in public) and said to them, "Go ahead and do it, go to Wounded Knee. You can't get in the BIA office and the tribal office, so take your brothers from the American Indian Movement and go to Wounded Knee and make your stand there."

On the list of demands presented to the Justice Department, Fools Crow was listed along with other chiefs and medicine men as supporters of the movement. After the occupiers declared themselves to be the "Independent Oglala Nation", Fools Crow traveled with Matthew King, his interpreter, and Russell Means to the United Nations to make a speech. Though no official transcript of this speech remains, there is no doubt to its significance.

The occupation lasted for 71 days, until an agreement was reached between federal officials and a Lakota delegation, which included Fools Crow.  Hank Adams, the personal representative of the President, arrived with an agreement to the proposal that the chiefs had sent to the White House on May 3. Adams met Fools Crow and a hundred others near a fence around the property. Adams handed a letter through a barbed–wire fence to Fools Crow, who was wearing the traditional attire of buckskin and a headdress. The letter appealed for the occupation of the village to come to an end. Fools Crow and the other leaders accepted the proposal, which stated that the White House would send representatives to Pine Ridge to discuss a treaty in the third week of May and would "get tough" on Dick Wilson, the unscrupulous chairman of the reservation. Fools Crow and the other chiefs delivered the letter to the AIM leaders and told them that he believed that it was time to end it.

After the murder of Frank Clearwater at Wounded Knee, and because the U.S. government would not allow his body to be buried there, his wife agreed to bury him on Leonard Crow Dog's property on the Rosebud Indian Reservation, and had the wake at Fools Crow's house, where the body was placed in a tipi and covered with a blanket for mourners to come to pay their respect.

In an article in The New York Times on May 8, 1973, the negotiations were said to have taken place at Fools Crow's house around the third week of May. In an interview, Dick Wilson said, "My people know that Fools Crow is a zero," plainly showing that he had no respect for the traditions that Fools Crow stood for. In Washington D.C. on May 17, The Oglalas had their promised White House meeting, and Fools Crow was present. Of the five promised White House aides, two were there. Fools Crow was told that the historic treaties were dead.

Fools Crow spoke at a congressional hearing on June 16 and 17, 1973, following the conclusion of the Wounded Knee occupation; he only spoke Lakota, as was his way, and used an interpreter, Matthew King, to translate for him. He gave his reasons for the occupation, the main reason being the removal of Dick Wilson. Senator George McGovern said that he would try to remove Wilson, but was not sure if he had the power to do so. Fools Crow asserted that McGovern had promised earlier to remove Dick Wilson, yet the violence continued.

Prayer before the United States Senate
In August 1975, thirty activists, including Fools Crow, traveled to Washington D.C. to discuss the 1868 Treaty, sovereignty, and the continuing violence and civil rights violations.  On September 5, Grandfather Fools Crow gave the opening prayer for the United States Senate.  This is believed to be an accurate translation of his words:

During the same morning as this prayer, the FBI staged a massive paramilitary raid on the property of Leonard Crow Dog.

"We shall never sell our sacred Black Hills." 
On September 10, 1976, Fools Crow delivered a lengthy speech to the Congressional Subcommittee on Interior and Insular Affairs. The speech, entitled the Joint Statement of Chief Frank Fools Crow and Frank Kills Enemy on Behalf of the Traditional Lakota Treaty Council Before Honorable Lloyd Meads Sub–Committee on Interior and Insular Affairs, was a plea for the return of the Black Hills to his people.  Later, the speech was printed up in poster form and widely disseminated over the reservations.  The full speech can be read here.

Family and death
His first wife, Fannie Afraid of Hawk, died in 1954.  His second wife, Kate, died in October 1988.  Fools Crow died on November 27, 1989, near Kyle, SD. He is believed to have been 99 years old.

Quotations

Film, cassette, and books 
 Screenwriter John Fusco was an adopted "hunka" relative of Fools Crow and based the character Grandpa Sam Reaches on his film Thunderheart.
 In 1990, Fusco brought actor Robert De Niro to the Pine Ridge Indian Reservation to meet Fools Crow. Fools Crow traded gifts with De Niro in the traditional Lakota manner.
 Native Spirit and the Sun Dance Way, DVD documentary, 2007, World Wisdom
 Audio Cassette: Fools Crow Holy Man (January 21, 2000)Original Release Date: May 1, 1993;  Label: Etherean
 Books with Thomas E. Mails:Fools Crow, University of Nebraska Press, 1979, 1990  Fools Crow: Wisdom and Power, Council Oak Books, 1990, 2002;  
 Suzanne Dupree, Frank Fools Crow Knowledge and Truth - Gift from The Ancestors 2nd Edition, CreateSpace Publishing, 2014.

References

Bibliography
 Anderson et al., Voices from Wounded Knee 1973 (Akwesasne Notes, 1974) 
 Ward Churchill and Jim Vander Wall, Agents of Repression (South End Press, 1988,'02) 
 Thomas E. Mails, Fools Crow (University of Nebraska Press, 1979,'90) 
 Peter Matthiessen, In the Spirit of Crazy Horse (Viking Penguin, 1983,'92) 
 Russell Means, Where White Men Fear to Tread (St. Martin's Press, 1995) 
 The New York Times Obituary, "Frank Fools Crow, a Sioux Tribal Leader", printed 29 November 1989  *
 Paul Chaat Smith and Robert Allen Warrior, Like a Hurricane: The Indian Movement from Alcatraz to Wounded Knee (The New Press, 1997) 
 Luther Standing Bear, Land of the Spotted Eagle (Houghton Mifflin Company, 1933) 
 Steve Talbot, Roots of Oppression: The American Indian Question (International Publishers, 1981)

External links
 Publisher webpage for the book:   Fools Crow  
 Publisher website for:   Fools Crow: Wisdom and Power  

1989 deaths
Religious figures of the indigenous peoples of North America
Oglala people
Native American leaders
Native American Roman Catholics
Year of birth uncertain